Hamish Mackie French (born 7 February 1964) is a Scottish former football player and coach. He played for Dundee United, Dunfermline Athletic, Alloa Athletic and Cowdenbeath.

Career

Playing
Hamish French was born in Methlick, Aberdeenshire. A product of the Scottish Highland Football League, French commenced his professional football career as a midfielder or forward with Keith FC of the Highland League. After several seasons with Keith FC, French signed for  Dundee United in 1987, but his career there was disrupted by injuries. He later went on to play for Dunfermline Athletic between 1991 and 2000 before finishing his career with spells at Alloa Athletic and Cowdenbeath.

External links
 
 

Living people
1964 births
People from Formartine
Scottish footballers
Dundee United F.C. players
Dunfermline Athletic F.C. players
Alloa Athletic F.C. players
Cowdenbeath F.C. players
Scottish Premier League players
Scottish Football League players
Dunfermline Athletic F.C. non-playing staff
Keith F.C. players
Highland Football League players
Association football midfielders
Footballers from Aberdeenshire